For the Winter Olympics, there are nine venues that have been used for short track speed skating. The 1988 events were held at the same venue with the curling events though both were demonstration events. Since then, the short track speed skating events have been held with the figure skating events.

References

Venues
 
Short track speed skating
Speed skating-related lists